Krzywina  is a village in the administrative district of Gmina Przeworno, within Strzelin County, Lower Silesian Voivodeship, in south-western Poland. Prior to 1945, it was part of Germany.

References

Krzywina